The Minister of Environment Water and Agriculture in Saudi Arabia is part of the government in Riyadh.

List of Ministers

References 

Environment
Saudi Arabia
Saudi Arabia